Noah Joshua Phillips (born August 3, 1978) is an American attorney who served on the Federal Trade Commission (FTC) from 2018 to 2022. Phillips was appointed to this position in 2018 by President Donald Trump, and was confirmed unanimously by the U.S. Senate. During the Biden Administration, Phillips was one of two Republicans on the FTC, along with fellow commissioner Christine S. Wilson.

Education and early career 
Phillips was born August 3, 1978, in Boston, Massachusetts. Phillips received his bachelor's degree (A.B.) from Dartmouth College in 2000 and his Juris Doctor degree (J.D.) from Stanford Law School in 2005. After graduating from law school, Phillips began his career at New York-based investment bank Wasserstein Perella & Co.

Phillips previously clerked for Judge Edward C. Prado during his tenure on the Court of Appeals for the Fifth Circuit. Phillips later worked as a litigator at Cravath, Swaine & Moore LLP in New York and Steptoe & Johnson LLP in Washington, D.C.

Government career 
From 2011, Phillips worked in the office of Senator John Cornyn (R-TX), where he advised on matters of antitrust and constitution law as well as consumer privacy and intellectual property (IP) policy. Cornyn praised Trump's decision to nominate Phillips to serve on the FTC in 2018, stating that Phillips “will be a big asset to the commission.” Phillips was sworn in on May 2, 2018, filling a position on the FTC left vacant by Julie Brill's resignation over two years prior.

Phillips resigned from office on October 14, 2022. Following his tenure on the FTC, Phillips joined law firm Cravath, Swaine & Moore as a partner.

References 

Living people
Dartmouth College alumni
Stanford Law School alumni
Cravath, Swaine & Moore people
Federal Trade Commission personnel
21st-century American lawyers
1978 births